The Warrgamay people, also spelt Warakamai, are an Aboriginal Australian people of the state of Queensland.

Language

Their language, Warrgamay, is now extinct. It was a variety of Dyirbalic, and appears to be composed of three distinct dialects:Wargamaygan spoken around the lower reaches of the Herbert River; Biyay spoken at the mouth of the Herbert, in the area of Halifax and Bemerside; and Hinchinbrook Biyay, spoken around the coastal area south of Cardwell and offshore on Hinchinbrook Island.

Words in the Warrgamay language include:
 knarbo (tame dog)
 gerolo (wild dog)
 baby (father)
 kora/yong/yonga (mother)
 mecolo (white man)

Country

Their northern neighbours were the Girramay, while to their south lay the Wulgurukaba.

Social organisation
The Warrgamay  were divided into several groups or clans:
 Ikelbara
 Doolebara
 Mungulbara
 Mandambara
 Karabara
 Bungabara
 Yoembara

The intermarriage of groups has been classified as follows:

Customs
Circumcision as an initiatory rite was unknown among the Warrgamay. They did practise tooth avulsion, ritual scarification and piercing of the septum to wear nose bones. Polygamy was common, and widows were married to their deceased husband's brother.

History of contact
The area of Halifax Bay first began to be settled by white colonialists in 1865, in the then Colony of Queensland. At that time the numbers of Warrgamay were estimated to amount to roughly 500 people. Within 15 years, they had declined by 300, a mere 40 of the surviving 200 being men. The difference was due to their being relentlessly hunted and gunned down by mounted native troopers under white supervision, together with settlers, both of whom "shot as many of the males of the tribe as possible".

Alternative names
Alternative names and spellings included, according to Tindale:
 Waragamai
 Wargamay
 Wargamaygan
 Bungabara
 Ikelbara
 Herbert River tribe

Notes

Citations

Sources

Aboriginal peoples of Queensland